WNTH is the FM radio station of New Trier High School. The station broadcasts at 88.1 MHz, and is owned by the Board of Education New Trier Township District 203.

The station is run by students under the supervision of faculty members. Each year, a new group of students is selected to take charge of the station. This group consists of the board, which includes 10 to 12 positions, and a staff of students. In addition to broadcasting WNTH student-hosted shows, the station also broadcasts live coverage of New Trier athletic events.

External links

 New Trier Radio, WNTH 88.1FM
 

NTH
High school radio stations in the United States